Moynahan is a family name with Irish origin and may refer to:

People
Bernard Thomas Moynahan Jr. (1918–1999), an American federal judge
Brian Moynahan, an English writer
Bridget Moynahan, an American model and actress
Julian Moynahan (1925-2014), an American literary critic and novelist 
Mike Moynahan (1856–1899), an American baseball player

Science
13620 Moynahan, an asteroid
Moynahan syndrome, a skin condition

See also
Minihan
Monaghan (disambiguation)
Monahan
Moynihan (surname)